Mary Magdalene in Ecstasy is a painting by the Italian baroque artist Artemisia Gentileschi. It is in a private European collection.

Description
A woman is shown in a seated position, with her head leaning back and hands clasped around her knee. She wears a purple and ochre gown over a lace-trimmed white chemise. As she leans back, her wavy blond hair cascades behind her and the chemise has slipped down, exposing her right shoulder. Her eyes are closed as she sits in a darkened landscape, strongly illuminated by a light source from the right of the painting.

Gentileschi's Interpretation
It is one of many paintings by Gentileschi of the Magdalene but the depiction is unusual for the period. The 2020 exhibition catalogue on Artemisia notes that "Mary Magdalene is more usually shown penitent in a landscape ... [here] she is passionately alive and in the throes of ecstatic rapture." The connection to (the various existing copies of) Caravaggio's Mary Magdalen in Ecstasy has been made. They both show more of Mary Magdalene's flesh and shoulder than versions by other artists, suggesting an erotic charge to the devotional scene. Other symbols that were typically used to demonstrate her repentance—skull, candle, ointment jar—are absent, leading art historians to focus on the more sensual feel of the painting in their identification and attribution.

Provenance
The painting was virtually unknown until a 2011 article revealed an old photograph of it.  Research subsequently confirmed its existence in a private French collection. In 2014, it was sold in Paris for 865,000 Euros (Approx. $1.15 million USD), more than 600,000 Euros above the asking price—a record price at the time for a work by Artemisia. That record was broken in 2018 with the sale of her Self-Portrait as Saint Catherine of Alexandria.

There is no precise date for the painting; the first half of the 1620s has been suggested. The painting is in a private European collection.

References 

Paintings by Artemisia Gentileschi
1610s paintings